Maria Faka (born January 2, 1979, in Thessaloniki) is a Greek sport shooter. She was selected as one of eleven shooters to represent the host nation Greece at the 2004 Summer Olympics in Athens, and had yielded numerous top 25 finishes in a major international competition, spanning the ISSF World Cup series and the European Championships. Faka trains at Arhelaos Katerinis Shooting Club in Katerini under the tutelage of Konstantinos Myrotis.

Faka was named as part of the host nation's shooting team to compete in the women's 10 m air rifle at the 2004 Summer Olympics in Athens. She had registered a minimum qualifying score of 393 from her outside-final finish at the ISSF World Cup meet in Changwon, South Korea to fill in one of the Olympic berths reserved to the host nation. Faka shot a decent 388 out of a possible 400 to tie for thirty-third place with Belgium's Daisy de Bock, Denmark's Ann Spejlsgaard, and Egypt's Shimaa Abdel-Latif in the qualifying round, failing to advance further to the final.

References

External links

Olympic Profile – In.gr

1979 births
Living people
Greek female sport shooters
Olympic shooters of Greece
Shooters at the 2004 Summer Olympics
Sportspeople from Thessaloniki
21st-century Greek women